The Lake of the Ozarks Community Bridge is a continuous truss bridge in Lake Ozark, Missouri. Opened on May 2, 1998, the bridge connects the east and west sides of the Lake of the Ozarks area. Construction on the bridge began in 1996 and the bridge cost over $43 million. To pay for the cost of the bridge, the bridge is a toll bridge with varying rates depending on the time of year.

History 
The Lake of the Ozarks Community Bridge Corporation was founded in 1992 to begin development of the bridge. A feasibility study began and was completed in August 1993 showing that the bridge could be a successful project. Construction began in 1996 through Jacobs Engineering Group, and construction was finished on May 1, 1998. An opening ceremony was held that day, and the bridge opened to traffic the next day.

In 2011, a new highway leading directly from the bridge to Missouri Route 5, along with further improvements to the bridge itself, was proposed. A financing proposal was submitted to the United States Department of Agriculture for $41 million, but was rejected. As a result, tolls were increased by 50 cents year-round to $3 in-season and $2 out-of-season.

As a result of the COVID-19 pandemic, bridge tolls were suspended in March 2020, but later resumed in May 2020. The suspension of tolls was the only major length of time in which the bridge was free to use.

Tolls 

Construction of the bridge has been funded primarily by bridge tolls, mandated for all crossing vehicles. Tolls vary based on the time of year, costing less out-of-season (November through April) than in-season (May through October). Tolls on the bridge are not collected through an auto-collection system, and toll booths have been used throughout the bridge's existence. A report found that implementing an auto-collection system would not be cost-effective.

In 2018, revenues from the bridge totaled $3,822,2213, with an expected increase of 4% in 2019. Approximately $450,000 of the revenue is used to pay bridge and toll booth employees.

As of 2018, remaining costs on the bridge are $17,400,000. The board overseeing the bridge expects that the bridge could be fully paid off by 2026.

References 

Lake of the Ozarks
Buildings and structures in Camden County, Missouri
Road bridges in Missouri
Continuous truss bridges in the United States
Bridges completed in 1998